Abdou Traoré (born 5 August 1981) is a Malian former footballer who played as a defender.

International career
Traoré was part of the Mali U20 national team at the 1999 FIFA World Youth Championship, finishing top of group D, losing to champion Spain in the semi-final and winning against Uruguay in the match for third place.

He was part of the senior national team at the 2004 Summer Olympics, which exited in the quarter finals, finishing top of group A, before losing to Italy in the next round.

Honors and awards
FIFA World Youth Championship third place: 1999

References

External links
 
 

1981 births
Living people
Malian footballers
Association football defenders
Mali international footballers
Mali under-20 international footballers
Footballers at the 2004 Summer Olympics
Olympic footballers of Mali
21st-century Malian people